Agatha Maksimova (born 23 June 1993) is a Russian-French actress, model and beauty pageant titleholder.

Personal life
Agatha was born on 23 June 1993 in Moscow, Russia. She grew up in Moscow before settling at the age of 19 in Paris, France. She is married to a French businessman Tibo Mattei. She speaks English, French and Russian.

Pageantry

Miss Europe 2018
Agatha joined the contest Miss Europe France, where she was crowned as Miss Europe France 2018 and represented France at Miss Europe 2018 that was held on 10 November 2018 on the first floor of the Eiffel Tower in Paris where she finished as the 2nd Runner Up.

Miss Intercontinental 2018
Agatha represented France at Miss Intercontinental 2018 which was held on 26 January 2019 at the Mall of Asia Arena in the Philippines. 87 delegates from different countries and territories competed for the beauty title.

Modeling
At the age of fifteen she was quickly noticed by agencies and photographers around the world. She posed for such campaigns as Lanvin Paris, Christian Louboutin, L'Oreal Paris, Ralph Lauren, Garnier, Rick Owens, Louis Vuitton and appears on the pages of Vogue, Harper's Bazaar, White Sposa, Glamour, L'Officiel, Femina, Women's Health and others. 

Since 2018 Agatha has been participating in Paris Fashion Week where she walks exclusively for Christophe Guillarmé during his fashion shows.

Acting
On 1 June 2019, Agatha Maksimova was recruited by the French acting agent Michaël Camarena, to develop and promote her talent as an actress. She studied and began her acting career with the famous acting coach Jack Waltzer (Los Angeles, USA). In July 2019, she starred in her first film directed by Maria Loche. In November 2019, she was confirmed for the main role of the horror movie "Je ne reviendrai pas" written and directed by Josué Esparon. In September 2020, together with Maxence Danet-Fauvel, Sabine Crossen, Axel Baille, and other honored actors she starred in The House of Gaunt movie directed by Joris Faucon Grimaud. She was invited to the most prestigious film festivals including Cannes Film Festival and Venice Film Festival.

Filmography

Film

Television

Music videos

References

External links
Agatha Maksimova on IMDb
Agatha Maksimova at Miss Intercontinental Official Website
Agatha Maksimova on the URBN Models

1993 births
Living people
French female models
Female models from Moscow
French people of Russian descent
Miss Europe winners
Russian beauty pageant winners
Naturalized citizens of France
Russian emigrants to France